Schoof (Dutch: ,) is a Low Saxon surname. Its Standard German equivalent is Schoff. Schaub is a High German dialect variant. Related to the English verb to shove, it means a gathering of like things. For example, birds migrating together are said to fly in a Schoof. It is also related to the English noun sheaf, which is another specific meaning of the word Schoof.

Notable people with the surname include:

Irene Schoof (born 1963), Dutch cricketer
Lauritz Schoof (born 1990), German rower
Manfred Schoof (born 1936), German jazz trumpet player
René Schoof (born 1955), Dutch mathematician
Sebastian Schoof (born 1980), German football player

See also
Schoofs
17958 Schoof, a main-belt asteroid
Schoof–Elkies–Atkin algorithm, extension of Schoof's algorithm by Noam Elkies and A. O. L. Atkin to improve its efficiency
Schoof's algorithm, efficient algorithm to count points on elliptic curves over finite fields